Robert Montague may refer to:
Robert Montague (Royal Navy officer) (1763–1830), British admiral
Robert Latane Montague (1829–1880), American politician
Robert Miller Montague (1899–1958), American Lieutenant General
Robert Montague (Jamaican politician) (born 1965), member of the Senate of Jamaica

See also
Robert Montagu (disambiguation)